Malli is a 1998 Indian Tamil-language feature film directed by Santosh Sivan. The film met with widespread critical acclaim upon release, and has been shown at many film festivals including the Toronto International Film Festival and the New York International Children's Film Festival. It won the  Best Film on Environment Conservation/Preservation at the 46th National Film Awards.

Synopsis

The film revolves around the story of Malli (P. Shwetha), a poor girl who spends most of her time helping her family by collecting firewood, and playing games in a nearby forest with her deaf and dumb best friend. Amongst her many dreams, her one main wish is to get herself a colourful dress to wear to a lively festival. However, during her quest she meets an old, local storyteller, who shares with her a story of a magical blue stone that can cure her best friend's muteness. With new horizons to pursue, she sets off to find this mysterious blue wishing stone.

Cast
P. Shwetha
Priya
Janagaraj
Parameshwaran
Manoj Pillai

Plot
Malli, a ten-year-old girl, tries her best to help her poor parents by collecting firewood.  In between; she spies on ‘Mr. Doctor’, the village Vet, who constantly converses with his patients from the animal world. Malli actually hero worships him; and even tries to imitate him secretly She has just two personal dreams: To own a new dress for the festival; and To get the ‘Blue Bead’ which can cure her friend's inborn deficiency.  Old Monu, the village storyteller had in her tale of "The Good Spirit". Monu habitually conceives purely imaginary heroic tales which impress Malli very deeply.  In that story, Monu illustrated how a ‘Good Spirit’ once had given Monu a Blue Bead as a gift.  Malli bribes ! Monu with some honey.  In return Monu recites to nonsensical, meaningless rhyme for inviting the Spirit. One back night, Malli tries to invite the Spirit with the rhyme, in vain. On the Festival Malli is thrilled with her new yellow dress her way back from the woods, she rescues a fawn shot down by a poacher. After a long, hazardous journey through thick woods she reaches the Vet's house late at night and waits through the night while he treats the injured fawn.  In the morning she begins her long trek back home with the new pet.  At the riverside, finding the fawn's happy reaction to its bird community, Malli sets it free.  Her despair is further compounded to find her new dress tattered beyond repair, when suddenly a bright object in the sand catches her eye – it's the Blue Bead!

Production
The film was made in 9 days on a shoestring budget of ₹25 lakh (worth ₹2.1 crore in 2021 prices) for National Centre for Children and Young People.

Awards
The film has been nominated for the following awards since its release:

2001 Independent Spirit Awards (United States)
 Nominated - Independent Spirit Award - Best Foreign Film - Malli - Santosh Sivan
2001 Political Film Society (United States)
 Nominated - PFS Award - Peace - Malli - Santosh Sivan
2001 Satellite Awards (United States)
 Nominated - Golden Satellite Award - Best Motion Picture (Foreign Language) - Malli - Santosh Sivan
1999 Chicago International Children's Film Festival (United States)
 Nominated - Adult Jury Award - 2nd Place - Malli - Santosh Sivan

The film has won the following awards since its release:

1998 Cairo International Film Festival (Egypt)
 Won - Golden Pyramid - Best Film - Malli - Santosh Sivan
 Won - Best Director - Santosh Sivan
2004 Los Angeles Indian Film Festival (United States)
 Won - Audience Award - Best Feature Film - Malli - Santosh Sivan
1999 National Film Awards (India)
 Won - Silver Lotus Award - Best Child Artist - P. Shwetha
 Won - Silver Lotus Award - Best Film on Environment Preservation/Conservation - Malli - Santosh Sivan

18th International Festival of Films For Children Ale Kino, (Poznań, Poland, 15–20 May 2000)

 Poznan Goats for the Best Director - Santosh Sivan.
 Poznan Goats for the Best Child - actress - Swetha
 Poznan Goats for the Music - Aslam Mustafa
 Award for the special mentions for the Marcinek distinction

References

External links

1998 films
1990s Tamil-language films
Best Film on Environment Conservation/Preservation National Film Award winners
Films directed by Santosh Sivan